The 2017 Thai League T4 (also known as the Euro Cake League for sponsorship reasons) was the 12th season of the Thai League 4, it had redirected from the regional league division 2, since its establishment in 2006. The 61 clubs will be divided into 6 groups (regions).

Regional League stage All locations

2017

Red Zone : 2017 Thai League 4 Bangkok Metropolitan Region
Yellow Zone : 2017 Thai League 4 Eastern Region
Pink Zone: 2017 Thai League 4 Western Region
Green Zone: 2017 Thai League 4 Northern Region
  Orange Zone: 2017 Thai League 4 North Eastern Region
Blue Zone: 2017 Thai League 4 Southern Region

List of Qualified Teams

T4 North (1)
  JL Chiangmai United

T4 Northeast (3)
  Sisaket United
   Mashare Chaiyaphum
   Muang Loei United

T4 East (2)
   Chanthaburi
   Marines Eureka

T4 West (2)
   Muangkan United
   BTU United

T4 Bangkok (2)
   North Bangkok University
   Samut Prakan

T4 South (1)
  Satun United

2017 Thai League 4 Champions League Play-off Round (1)
  Chiangrai City

Champions League Knockout stage

Stadium and locations

Play-off round
Runner-up of 2017 Thai League 4 Northern Region and Runner-up of 2017 Thai League 4 Southern Region football teams pass to this round. this round plays sudden death matches. The winner will entered to the First round.

First round 
Winner of Play-off round and 11 Thai football teams pass to this round. this round provide 2 part to Group A and Group B. Each group has 6 Thai football teams. It is paired to 3 couples and plays Home-Away matches. Thai football teams which take total score over opportunity for win this round and pass to Final round. Away goals rule is used to this tournament.

Group A

Chiangrai City won 6–5 on aggregate.

Chanthaburi won 4–3 on aggregate.

1–1 on aggregate. BTU United won 7–6 on penalties.

Group B

JL Chiangmai United won 5–1 on aggregate.

Muangkan United won 2–1 on aggregate.

2–2 on aggregate. Marines Eureka won on away goals.

Final round 
6 Thai football teams, Which win opportunity, pass to this round. this round provide 2 part to 2017 Thai League 4 champions league round Group A and 2017 Thai League 4 champions league round Group B. Each region has 3 Thai football teams. It plays Round-robin matches. Thai football teams which get champion, runner-up and 3rd position which has the best scores of each region to were promoted to 2018 Thai League 3. Mini-league rule is used to this tournament.

Group A

2017 Thai League 4 champions league round Group B

Ranking of third-placed teams
The best third-placed team would promoted to 2018 Thai League 3.
<noinclude>

Teams promoted to 2018 Thai League 3

 BTU United (Group A winners)
 JL Chiangmai United (Group B winners)
 Chiangrai City (Group A runners-up)
 Muangkan United (Group B runners-up)
 Marines Eureka (Best third-placed)

See also
 2017 Thai League
 2017 Thai League 2
 2017 Thai League 3
 2017 Thailand Amateur League
 2017 Thai FA Cup
 2017 Thai League Cup
 2017 Thailand Champions Cup

References

 First round and Final round of Champions league
 http://www.thailandsusu.com/webboard/index.php?topic=386949.0
 http://www.thailandsusu.com/webboard/index.php?topic=386920.0
 http://www.smmsport.com/reader.php?news=205267
 http://www.smmsport.com/reader.php?news=204993
 http://www.smmsport.com/reader.php?news=204940
 http://www.thailandsusu.com/webboard/index.php?topic=386803.0
 http://www.thailandsusu.com/webboard/index.php?topic=386771.0
 http://www.smmsport.com/reader.php?news=205601
 http://www.smmsport.com/reader.php?news=205649
 http://www.thailandsusu.com/webboard/index.php?topic=387074.0
 http://www.thailandsusu.com/webboard/index.php?topic=387058.0
 http://www.smmsport.com/reader.php?news=206293
 http://www.thailandsusu.com/webboard/index.php?topic=387332.0

External links
 Official Champions league rule

Thai League T4 seasons
4